Re:Blue (stylized Re:BLUE) is the fourth Korean extended play (seventh overall) by South Korean rock band CNBLUE. It was released on January 14, 2013 with the track "I'm Sorry" as the promotional single.

Background and release
The group's comeback in South Korea was officially announced on December 17, 2012 via their concert Blue Night, held in Seoul. The mini-album's release date was scheduled for January 14, day of the group's third Korean anniversary and also third anniversary of the group's first Korean mini-album Bluetory. The first teaser was revealed on the group's website on January 3, 2013 with screencaps of the drama video teaser. The image also revealed 8 blank spaces (″___ _″) that speculated if it was the name of the promotional track or of the mini-album's title. On January 7, the first video teasers were released. The teasers are emotional versions of the members expressing sadness or fury after a girl break up with them and says "I'm sorry". All individual video teasers were released on the same day. On January 9, a photo teaser was released. The photoshoot of the album was made in the streets of London. The group's agency, FNC Entertainment, revealed: "We worked hard to find a location that showcases London’s exotic aura. Although the filming was delayed due to the rainy weather, everyone passionately participated in the photoshoot." One day later, on January 10, the first music video teaser was released. On January 11, the second music video teaser was released. On January 14, along with the group's third Korean anniversary celebration, the mini-album and music video of "I'm Sorry" were released at the same time.

Composition
The mini-album is composed by six tracks, five Korean and an English track. A major part of the tracks were written by the member Jung Yong-hwa. The tracks "I'm Sorry", used as title track of the mini-album, and "Naram Namja" were written by Yong-hwa and Han Sung-ho and composed by Yong-hwa and Han Seung-hoon. "Coffee Shop" and "La La La" were written and composed by Yong-hwa. "Na Geudaeboda" was written by Han Sung-ho and Kim Jae-yang, who also composed the song along with the member Lee Jong-hyun. The English version of the song "Where You Are" was written and composed by Yong-hwa. The song was originally recorded in Japanese and first released on the Japanese album Code Name Blue as a bonus track of the CD+DVD edition.

Promotion
The promotions of the song "I'm Sorry" started on January 18, 2013 on KBS' show Music Bank. They are also promoting on the shows Music Core, Inkigayo and Show Champion. Three songs of the mini-album were also performed during the first week of promotions: the song "Myself More Than You" on Music Bank on January 18, the English version of "Where You Are" on Music Core on January 19 and "Coffee Shop" on Inkigayo on January 20. At the date, the song won 5 TV show awards, three on Show Champion: on January 30, February 6 and on February 13 and also won two on Music Bank on February 1.February 8 The promotions ended on February 24, on SBS' Inkigayo.

Track listing

Chart performance
On January 12, it was revealed that the album gained a lot of interest in South Korea and Japan, it topped the number one spot on Japan's Tower Records pre-order albums. The mini-album also surpassed the 100,000 mark only with pre-orders in South Korea. In its first day of release, the title track "I'm Sorry" topped all the South Korean music portal charts. The album also dominated the Gaon Charts for 2 weeks in a row.

Album

Singles

Album sales

Release history

References

External links
 

2013 EPs
CNBLUE EPs
Korean-language EPs
FNC Entertainment EPs